Pat Delaney (born 27 July 1954 in Kinnitty, County Offaly, Ireland) is a retired Irish hurling manager and former player. He played hurling with his local club Kinnitty and with the Offaly senior inter-county team in the 1970s and 1980s.  Delaney later served as manager of the Laois senior hurling team from 2001 until 2002.

Playing career

Club

Delaney played his club hurling with his local Kinnitty club and enjoyed much success.  He captured his first senior county title in 1978.  The 1980s saw Kinnitty become one of the strongest club teams in the county.  Delaney captured three county titles in-a-row in 1983, 1984 and 1985.  These victories later saw Kinnitty play in the final of the Leinster club championship; however, Delaney's side were defeated on all three occasions.

Inter-county

Delaney first came to prominence on the inter-county scene in the 1970s as a member of the Offaly minor and under-21 hurling teams. He had little success in these grades and little more was expected when he joined the senior grade as Offaly were down the pecking order in terms of hurling in Leinster. He made his senior debut in October 1974 when he lined out in the number 10 jersey against Antrim in the National Hurling League.  

All changed in 1980 as Delaney's Offaly side came from nowhere to defeat All-Ireland champions Kilkenny in the Leinster final.  It was Offaly's first-ever senior provincial title; however, only about 8,000 people were present at Croke Park to witness the historic occasion.  Offaly's dream season came to an end in the All-Ireland semi-final as Galway defeated Delaney's side by two points in the first-ever meeting between these two bordering counties.  

The following year Offaly proved that their victory wasn't a fluke as the team retained the Leinster title.  This victory allowed Delaney's side to advance to their first-ever All-Ireland final.  For the second year in-a-row Offaly faced Galway in the business end of the championship.  The game was a close affair with Galway leading by six points at one stage.  Galway failed to score for the last twenty-three minutes as Johnny Flaherty handpassed the winning goal for Offaly.  It was the county's first All-Ireland title.  Delaney's performance throughout the championship failed to earn him an All-Star award; however, he was named as the Texaco Hurler of the Year.  

Offaly surrendered their Leinster crown to Kilkenny for the next two seasons; however, Delaney captured a third provincial medal in 1984.  A defeat of Galway in the All-Ireland semi-final allowed Offaly to advance to the centenary year All-Ireland final.  Cork provided the opposition on that occasion.  It was the first-ever meeting between these two sides in a very special final at Semple Stadium in Thurles.  The game was a close affair in the first-half; however, Cork captured goals in the second half to clinch the victory.  

In 1985 Delaney captured a fourth Leinster title as Offaly retained their provincial dominance.  The subsequent All-Ireland final saw Offaly take on Galway for the third time of the 1980s.  In an exciting game which saw a Joe Dooley goal being disallowed, Offaly captured the victory on a score line of 2-11 to 1-12.  Not only had Delaney captured a second All-Ireland medal but he was also presented with an All-Star award.  Delaney retired from inter-county hurling shortly after this victory.

Provincial

Delaney also lined out with Leinster in the inter-provincial hurling competition; however, he never won a Railway Cup medal.

References

 

1954 births
Living people
Hurling managers
Kinnitty hurlers
Offaly inter-county hurlers
Leinster inter-provincial hurlers
All-Ireland Senior Hurling Championship winners